Goodnight Nobody is an album by Julie Doiron, released in 2004.

Track listing
 "Snow Falls in November" – 5:18
 "Sorry Part III" – 2:31
 "Last Night" – 3:07
 "No Moneymakers" – 3:40
 "Tonight is No Night" – 1:27
 "Dirty Feet" – 3:17
 "Dance All Night" – 3:22
 "When I Awoke" – 3:05
 "The Songwriter" – 4:43
 "Some Blues" – 3:48
 "Banjo" – 3:38
 "Good Night" – 3:00

References

External links
Goodnight Nobody at Google Music

2004 albums
Julie Doiron albums
Jagjaguwar albums